Berberodes is a genus of moths in the family Geometridae erected by Achille Guenée in 1857.

Species
Berberodes conchylata Guenée, 1857 Brazil
Berberodes impura Dyar, 1914 Panama
Berberodes campylophleps Dyar, 1914 Panama

References

Abraxini